Small Sacrifice is a studio album by Christian singer-songwriter Twila Paris. It was originally released independently on Paris' Mountain Spring Music imprint available at her website and at LifeWay Christian Stores in late 2007. The album married the two parts of her career by including both inspirational pop/adult contemporary songs and original praise and worship compositions. Her first radio single from the album "Live to Praise" climbed to number 3 on Radio and Records Christian Inspirational chart. Small Sacrifice was released for wider distribution by Koch Records on February 24, 2009. Production was handled by John Hartley, who produced Paris' 2001 Dove Award winning children's music album Bedtime Prayers: Lullabies and Peaceful Worship.

 Track listing 
All songs written by Twila Paris.
"We Know Love" - 4:32
"I Can Do All Things" - 4:28
"You Lead Me" - 3:42
"Small Sacrifice" - 3:31
"Lord I Need You" - 4:06
"Live to Praise" - 3:57
"Not Forgotten" - 5:42
"There Is a Plan" - 5:16
"You Are a Great God" - 4:14
"Alleluia" - 4:38

 Personnel 
 Twila Paris – vocals 
 Jamie Kenney – keyboards 
 Gary Burnette – guitars 
 Chris Graffagnio – guitars 
 Chris Donohue – bass 
 Dennis Holt – drums, percussion 
 Ken Lewis – drums, percussion 
 Chris Eaton – backing vocals 
 Jennifer Paige – backing vocals
 Chris Rodriguez – backing vocals 
 Michelle Tumes – backing vocals Production'''
 John Hartley – producer 
 Colin Heldt – engineer 
 David Schober – engineer, mixing 
 John Mayfield – mastering 
 Susannah Parrish – graphic design 
 Michael Gomez – cover photography 
 Norman Miller – management

 Critical reception 

Mark Lawrence of Cross Rhythms said of Small Sacrifice'' that the album "combines songs for congregational worship such as the piano-driven, hymn-like 'I Can Do All Things' and the upbeat pop of 'We Know Love' with more adult contemporary tracks such as the folksy/Celtic infused 'There Is A Plan' and the hauntingly beautiful ballad 'You Lead Me' which takes the listener on a journey through Psalm 23." Lawrence mentions that the title song and "Lord I Need You" are the quieter tracks "where her voice lifts and gives life to the simple melodies. At times the balladry slips squarely into the middle-of-the-road and the congregational worship songs are just a hotch-potch of tired clichés such as on 'Live To Praise.' But overall Twila sounds as fresh now as she did 25 years ago."

Radio singles

References 

2007 albums
Twila Paris albums
MNRK Music Group albums